St. Mary's Catholic Church, located in the city of Memphis, Tennessee, United States, is a historic Roman Catholic Church. The building is listed on the U.S. National Register of Historic Places, a status it gained in 1974.

History
The church was designed by Memphis architect James B. Cook in the Gothic Revival style. It was dedicated in 1870.

See also
 National Register of Historic Places listings in Shelby County, Tennessee

References

Churches in Memphis, Tennessee
Churches on the National Register of Historic Places in Tennessee
Roman Catholic churches in Tennessee
National Register of Historic Places in Memphis, Tennessee